WiFi-Where is a tool that facilitates detecting wireless LANs using the 802.11b, 802.11a and 802.11g WLAN standards. Versions exist for the operating systems iOS and Palm OS. Originally created in June 2004 for the Palm OS by Jonathan Hays of Hazelware Software, the IP for WiFi-Where was licensed to 3Jacks Software in 2009. An iPhone version of the application was released in January 2010, but was pulled from the App Store by Apple in March 2010. As of 2010, it is available in the Jailbroken Cydia store.

Uses
The program is commonly used for:
 Wardriving
 Verifying network configurations
 Finding locations with poor coverage in a WLAN
 Detecting causes of wireless interference
 Detecting unauthorized (rogue) access points

Features
Some of the unique features that the program implements are:
 Continuous scanning mode
 GPS logging (when a device supports it)
 Email scan results
 Email attachments (OS 3.0 only) in NetStumbler , CSV, or Google Earth KML formats
 Option to filter hotspots by signal strength and location accuracy
 Displays detailed information about each network, including name/SSID, signal strength, raw RSSI value, security and authentication modes (WEP/WPA/WPA2), location, MAC address
 Save passwords for secure networks
 Upload hotspots to popular wardriving website Wigle.net

App store removal
According to a blog post on 3Jacks web site, as of 3 March 2010, Apple removed all WiFi scanning apps, including WiFi-Where, from sale on the App Store for using private frameworks to access wireless information.

References

Wireless networking